Daryush Shokof (Persian: داریوش شکوف, born 1954) is an Iranian artist, film director, writer, and film producer based in Germany.

Biography 
He was born as Ali Reza Shokoufandeh on 25 June 1954 in Tehran, Imperial State of Iran. Shokof graduated from Eastern New Mexico University with a degree in Physics and Mathematics. Shokof received an MBA from University of Dallas in Texas.

Alleged kidnapping
Shokof claimed that he was kidnapped by four terrorists in the city of Cologne, Germany, in late May 2010, and was kept for over twelve days in the hands of four Arabic-speaking men. German police denied his statement and told the press that this story was not verifiable, and might have been staged to attract attention.

Filmography

This filmography includes only films listed in IMDB.

Awards

New York International Independent Film and Video Festival (NYIIFVF) Los Angeles, July 2011
 Best Director of a Feature Film – for Hitler's Grave
New York International Independent Film and Video Festival, Los Angeles, March 2007
Award for Best International Director – category feature for: Breathful (2007)
New York International Independent Film and Video Festival, Winter 2000
Feature Film Award for Best Experimental Film – Tenussian Vacuvasco (2000)
Locarno International Film Festival 1996
Nominated for Golden Leopard for: Seven Servants (1996)

See also
 Islamic art
 Iranian art
 Islamic calligraphy
 List of Iranian artists

References

External links

Article: Interview with Daryush Shokof: The Magician from Persia on haolam.de from 2014 (in German)

1954 births
Living people
Eastern New Mexico University alumni
Iranian human rights activists
German film directors
Iranian screenwriters
Iranian emigrants to Germany
People from Tehran
Iranian exiles
Iranian film directors
University of Texas at Arlington alumni